Maniacal refers to mania, an abnormally elevated emotional state.

Maniacal may also refer to:

Maniacal (film), a 2003 horror film
Maniacal (album) by Sworn Enemy
"Maniacal", a song from the Front Line Assembly,  album Civilization

See also
Mania (disambiguation)
Maniac (disambiguation)